This is a list of Queen's University Belfast people including notable alumni and staff of Queen's University Belfast, Northern Ireland. As one of only two universities in Northern Ireland, the university has been attended by a large proportion of the nation's professionals.

This list does not include people whose only connection with the university consists in the award of an honorary degree.

Staff

 Mike Baillie – Professor Emeritus of Palaeoecology
 Sir George Bain – former President and Vice-Chancellor; Chair of the Independent Review of the Fire Service
 Paul Bew, Baron Bew – Professor of Irish Politics
 Ciarán Carson – poet, novelist; Professor of English and Director of the Seamus Heaney Centre for Poetry
 Colin Cooper – Senior Lecturer in psychology; devises IQ tests for the BBC's Test the Nation programme
 Sir Bernard Crossland – former President of the Institution of Mechanical Engineers
 Edith Newman Devlin (1926–2012) former English lecturer, academic and writer
 Richard English – Professor of Politics
 Mick Fealty – Visiting Research Fellow at the Institute of Governance
 Sir Peter Gregson – former President and Vice-Chancellor
 Adrian Guelke – Professor of Comparative Politics
 Sir Charles Antony Richard Hoare - former Professor of Computing Science
 John Hewitt – the university's first writer-in-residence
 Thomas Jones – former Professor of Economics
 James Mallory – Professor in Prehistoric Archaeology
 Michael Mann – Visiting Research Professor in Sociology
 Sir John McCanny – Regius Professor of Electronics and Computer Engineering and Director of ECIT
 Sir William McCrea – former Professor of Mathematics
 George Mitchell – former Chancellor, former United States Senator
 Cornelius O'Leary – former Professor of Political Science
 Kamalesh Sharma – former Chancellor, former Commonwealth Secretary-General
 Raymond Warren – former Professor of Composition and Professor of Music
 John H. Whyte – former Professor of Political Science

Alumni

Academia 
 Hutton Ayikwei Addy – Professor of Public Health, first dean of the University for Development Studies Medical School 
 Tan Sri Anuwar Ali – 2nd Vice-Chancellor of Open University Malaysia
 Sir George Vance Allen – 1st Vice-Chancellor of the University of Malaya
 Sir David Bates – physicist
 Sir Colin Campbell – former Vice-Chancellor of the University of Nottingham
 Tan Sri Chin Fung Kee – former Vice-Chancellor of University of Malaya and Professor of Civil Engineering
 Art Cosgrove – former President of University College Dublin
 Roy Crawford – Vice-Chancellor of University of Waikato, New Zealand
 María Ester Grebe — ethnomusicologist
 Robert John Gregg (1912-1998) - Head of Department of Linguistics at University of British Columbia
 Matthew McDiarmid (1914–1996) – literature professor and campaigning academic; editor of the canonical Scottish Text Society editions of the poets Robert Fergusson and Blind Hary
 Gerry McKenna – former Vice-Chancellor and President of University of Ulster
 Joseph Mifsud – Maltese academic
 David Beers Quinn – author and historian
 Philipp Rosemann – philosopher and holder of the Chair of Philosophy at Maynooth University
 Rita Segato – anthropologist, feminist and academic
 Tan Sri Rafiah Salim – Vice-Chancellor of University of Malaya; former Assistant Secretary General for the United Nations Human Resource Management
 Karen McAuliffe – Reader in Law and Birmingham Fellow, University of Birmingham, UK
Robert N Moles – academic and legal researcher
Brian Wilson (academic) - Professor of astrophysics; former and longest ever serving Vice-Chancellor of the University of Queensland

Arts and media 

 Stephen Nolan – broadcaster
 Andrew Beatty – journalist and editor
 John Boyd - playwright and radio producer
 Wesley Burrowes – playwright and screenwriter
 Kasia Glowicka – composer
 Edwin Lawrence Godkin – American publicist
 Kieran Goss – singer/songwriter
 Alan Green – BBC Radio 5 Live football commentator
 Seamus Heaney – Nobel Prize-winning poet
 Patrick Hicks – poet
 Patrick Kielty – television presenter
 Phil Kieran – club DJ
 Annie Mac – radio DJ
 Tony McAuley – broadcaster and musician
 Eamonn McCann – journalist and civil rights activist
 Ty McCormick – award-winning American foreign correspondent
 Lisa McGee – award-winning writer and director
 Paul Muldoon – Pulitzer Prize-winning poet
 Bill Neely – Journalist
 Liam Neeson – actor
Donatus Nwoga – literary critic
 Stephen Rea – actor
 Rigsy – radio and club DJ; television presenter
 Nick Ross – broadcaster
 Zöe Salmon – television presenter
 Mark Simpson – BBC Ireland correspondent
 Henry Vega – composer
 Helen Waddell – poet, translator and playwright
 Alexander Walker – journalist, author and film critic

Legal, military and civil service 
 Hulusi Akar – 29th Chief of the General Staff of the Turkish Armed Forces
 Air Commodore David Case – British Armed Forces' most senior black officer
 Colonel Tim Collins – former Colonel in the British Army, known for his inspirational speech during the Iraq War in 2003
 Sir Ronnie Flanagan – Her Majesty's Chief Inspector of Constabulary; former Chief Constable of Police Service of Northern Ireland and Royal Ulster Constabulary
 Sir Robert Hart, 1st Baronet – Inspector General of the Chinese Imperial Maritime Customs
 Brian Hutton, Baron Hutton – former British Law Lord and Chair of the Hutton Inquiry
 Brian Kerr, Baron Kerr of Tonaghmore – former Lord Chief Justice of Northern Ireland; Justice of the Supreme Court of the United Kingdom; the youngest and the only Justice who is not graduated from Oxbridge
 Joseph Henry Longford – British consul in Japan and academic
 John MacDermott, Baron MacDermott – Lord Chief Justice of Northern Ireland
 Edward Macnaghten, Baron Macnaghten – former British Law Lord and politician
 Eoin MacNeill – Founder of the Gaelic League
 Monica McWilliams – Chief Commissioner of the Northern Ireland Human Rights Commission; co-founder of the Northern Ireland Women's Coalition; former Professor of Women's Studies and Social Policy at the University of Ulster
 Sir Andrew Porter, 1st Baronet – former Master of the Rolls and Attorney General for Ireland
 Sir James Russell – Chief Justice of Hong Kong
 Sir Barry Shaw – first Director of Public Prosecutions for Northern Ireland
 Paul Tweed – media lawyer 
 Air Vice Marshal Sir William Tyrrell – Irish Rugby international; member of first official British Isles Rugby team in 1910, decorated military officer; surgeon to King George VI of the United Kingdom
 Sir Hiram Shaw Wilkinson – Chief Justice of the British Supreme Court for China and Corea

Politicians

 John Alderdice, Baron Alderdice – former Leader of the Alliance Party of Northern Ireland; former Presiding Officer of the Northern Ireland Assembly; consultant psychotherapist
 Jim Allister – leader of Northern Ireland's Traditional Unionist Voice party
 Clare Bailey – Green Party leader and MLA for Belfast South
 Dominic Bradley – Social Democratic and Labour Party MLA for Newry and Armagh
 Diane Dodds – Democratic Unionist Party MLA for West Belfast
 Nigel Dodds – Barrister and Democratic Unionist Party MP for North Belfast
 Mark Durkan – Social Democratic and Labour Party MP for Foyle; former Leader of the SDLP
 Reg Empey – former Leader of the Ulster Unionist Party
 Toiréasa Ferris – Sinn Féin politician; first female Mayor of Kerry; first Sinn Féin Chairperson of Kerry County Council
 Arlene Foster, Baroness Foster of Aghadrumsee – Democratic Unionist Party MLA for Fermanagh and South Tyrone; Minister for the Environment
 Simon Hamilton – Democratic Unionist Party MLA for Strangford
 Tun Lim Keng Yaik – former Energy Minister of Malaysia
 Naomi Long – Leader of the Alliance Party; Minister of Justice and former Lord Mayor of Belfast
 Brian Mawhinney – former MP and Chairman of the Conservative Party (UK)
 Mary McAleese – former President of Ireland
 Nelson McCausland – Democratic Unionist Party MLA for North Belfast
 Brian McConnell, Baron McConnell – former Ulster Unionist MP
 Michelle McIlveen – Democratic Unionist Party MLA for Strangford
 Sheelagh Murnaghan – former Ulster Liberal Party MP
 Gearóid Ó Cuinneagáin – Irish fascist and leader of Ailtirí na hAiséirghe
 Ian Paisley Jnr – North Antrim MLA for Democratic Unionist Party
 Janil Puthucheary – Minister of State, Ministry of Communications and Information Singapore, PAP MP for Punggol Coast
 Tan Sri Ramli Ngah Talib – former Speaker of the Malaysian Parliament
 Tengku Razaleigh Hamzah – former Minister of Finance of Malaysia
 John P Savage – Premier of Nova Scotia
 Eóin Tennyson – Alliance Party MLA for Upper Bann
 David Trimble – former First Minister of Northern Ireland and Nobel Peace Prize winner
 Peter Weir, Baron Weir of Ballyholme – Democratic Unionist Party MLA for North Down
 Jim Wells – Democratic Unionist Party MLA for South Down
 Sammy Wilson – Democratic Unionist Party MP for East Antrim

Religion 
 Anthony Farquhar – Auxiliary Bishop of Down and Connor; Assistant Chaplain of the University 1970–1975
 Cahal Daly – Archbishop Emeritus of The Archdiocese of Armagh – former lecturer; Reader in Scholastic Philosophy, 1946–1967
 James McEvoy – emeritus chair of scholastic philosophy (1943–2010)
 Donal McKeown – Auxiliary Bishop of Down and Connor
 Morris S. Seale – theologian
 Patrick Walsh – Bishop Emeritus of Down and Connor; Catholic Chaplain of the University 1963–1970

Science 

 John Bodkin Adams – physician and suspected serial killer
 Dame Ingrid Allen – neuropathologist and multiple sclerosis researcher
 John S. Bell – physicist and developer of Bell's Theorem, regarded by some in the quantum physics community as one of the most important theorems of the 20th century
 John Edward Campbell – mathematician, academic and co-developer of the Baker-Campbell-Hausdorff formula
 Thomas Henry Flewett – virologist who suggested the name Rotavirus to the virus which is most common cause of diarrhoeal disease
 Erwin Gabathuler - particle physicist
 Terence Ingold – mycologist and botanist
 Henrik Kacser – biochemist and geneticist
 H Douglas Keith – polymer research scientist
 Lavinia Loughridge – physician and nephrologist
 Domhnall MacAuley – physician, medical academic, and medical journal editor
 Daniel McCaughan OBE, FREng – physicist, engineer and industrialist
 Mollie McGeown – physician, nephrologist and health service pioneer
 Frank Pantridge – inventor of the portable defibrillator
Peter Rice – structural engineer
 Leslie Skene – psychiatrist
 Margarita Dawson Stelfox (née Mitchell) - botanist
 Isobel Addey Tate – World war I doctor
 George P. L. Walker – geologist and vulcanologist
 William Parkinson Wilson – mathematician and founder of astronomical observatory
 Richard Henry Yapp - botanist

Sport 
 David Cullen – 2007 winner of the Arthur Ashe for Courage Award at the 2007 ESPY Awards ceremony
 Thomas MacDonald (1908–1998) – cricketer
 Martin O'Neill – former footballer and former Leicester City, Celtic and Aston Villa manager who studied law at Queen's before being scouted by Nottingham Forest
 Trevor Ringland – former Ireland and British Lions rugby player, 2007 winner of the Arthur Ashe for Courage Award at the 2007 ESPY Awards ceremony
 Air Vice Marshal Sir William Tyrrell – Irish Rugby international, member of first official British Isles Rugby team in 1910, decorated military officer, and surgeon to King George VI of the United Kingdom

Other
 Kafeel Ahmed – suspected terrorist in the 2007 Glasgow International Airport attack
 Eamon Collins – former Provisional IRA member who later wrote a tell all book about life in the IRA
Adam McGibbon - environmentalist and writer
 Michael McGoldrick – murder victim during The Troubles
 Laurence McKeown – former Provisional IRA member who took part in the 1981 Irish hunger strike

See also
List of chancellors of Queen's University Belfast
List of vice-chancellors of Queen's University Belfast

References

 
Queen's University Belfast
Queens